The University of Maryland Eastern Shore Hawks (commonly UMES and also known as the Eastern Shore Hawks) are the fifteen sports teams representing the University of Maryland Eastern Shore in Princess Anne, Maryland in intercollegiate athletics.  These include men and women's basketball, cross country, indoor track, outdoor track, and tennis; women's sports include bowling, softball, and volleyball; men's sports include baseball and golf. The Hawks are members of the Mid-Eastern Athletic Conference (MEAC) in most sports, with other memberships in the Eastern College Athletic Conference and Northeast Conference.

The Hawks compete in the MEAC for all sports except baseball, men's golf, and women's golf, in which they compete as Northeast Conference members, and additionally in the ECAC for cross country, track and field and bowling.

Teams

NCAA national championships

Team

References

External links